Justice Grant or Judge Grant, may refer to:

Britt Grant (born 1978), justice of the Georgia Supreme Court
Claudius B. Grant (1835–1921), chief justice of the Michigan Supreme Court
John T. Grant (judge) (1920–2010), associate justice of the Nebraska Supreme Court
William Grant, Lord Grant (1909–1972), Lord Justice Clerk of Scotland

See also

 
 
 Justice (disambiguation)
 Judge (disambiguation)
 Grant (disambiguation)